Gobu may be,

Gobu language
Gobu Seyo, Ethiopia
Göbü, Zonguldak